Benjamin Queair Jones (born 1977) is an American director, fine artist, voice actor, animator, producer, writer and storyboard artist. He was a co-founder and member of the art collective Paper Rad from 2001–2008, as well as his own studio Ben Jones Studio, Inc. in 2008. He has worked on various animated television programs and web series for Animation Domination High-Def (ADHD). Since 2017, Jones is the creative director of Bento Box Entertainment. He lives and works in Los Angeles, California.

Biography
Jones was born in 1977 in Pittsburgh, Pennsylvania and grew up in central Massachusetts. His family collected computers, a hobby initiated by his father, Frank, who was a software engineer. This influenced Jones a lot, so much that later he would draw inspiration for his future style of art and design.

Jones attended Massachusetts College of Art and Design, and graduated in 1999 with a B.F.A. in Studio of Interrelated Media (SIM).

Career
While studying in Boston at Massachusetts College of Art and Design, he began working in an art collaboration with classmate Christopher Forgues (C.F.) under the name "Paper Radio". Art in America magazine named Jones one of the, "most important cartoonists of their generation" for his work with Paper Radio. In 2000, he founded the East Coast art collective Paper Rad, with the artists Jacob and Jessica Ciocci. Paper Rad is best known for creating comics, zines, video art, net art, MIDI files, paintings, installations, and music with a distinct "lo-fi" aesthetic.

Ben Jones founded the animation studio Ben Jones Studio, Inc. in 2008 after Paper Rad had concluded in 2008.

Ben Jones collaborated with PFFR and Williams Street on a 2007 pilot for Adult Swim titled Neon Knome. It was passed by the network and went on to become rebranded as a Cartoon Network show called The Problem Solverz. Jones is the main creator and the voice actor of Alfe and Roba in the Cartoon Network show, The Problem Solverz.

In 2013, Jones became the creative director of the Fox Saturday night programming block ADHD, where he released his series, Stone Quackers. The program aired as sneak peek on October 27, 2014 on FXX and a spin-off, Gothball, was premiered as a web-series on May 1, 2015 on the ADHD YouTube channel. All the shows featured on ADHD are now owned by The Walt Disney Company after their 2019 acquisition of 21st Century Fox.

In 2020, he was given a career at Bento Box Entertainment and Universal Animation Studios to co-create Saturday Morning All Star Hits! in 2021 for Netflix, alongside Kyle Mooney.

Jone's work in fine art painting includes psychedelic themed painting, described as brightly colored, often visually flat or with pattern.

Filmography

Music videos
 Coldplay – "A L I E N S" (with Diane Martel)
 LSD – "Genius"

References

Further reading
 O'Leary, Shannon. (May 15, 2012) How Cartoon Network Became a Haven for Some of the Best Independent Comic Book Creators Working Today. Publishers Weekly.

External links
 Official website
 

American cartoonists
American male voice actors
1977 births
Living people
Paper Rad
Artists from Pittsburgh
American storyboard artists
Creative directors
American animators
American animated film directors
American animated film producers
American male television writers
American television writers
Screenwriters from Pennsylvania
Massachusetts College of Art and Design alumni
Cartoon Network Studios people